Karam Dad Wahla is a Pakistani politician who was a Member of the Provincial Assembly of the Punjab, from June 2008 to May 2018.

Early life and education
Wahla was born on 24 March 1968 in Lahore.

He received his early education from Army Burn Hall College and Aitchison College. He graduated from Forman Christian College in 1989.

Political career
Wahla was elected to the Provincial Assembly of the Punjab as an independent candidate for Constituency PP-219 (Khanewal-VIII) in by-polls held in June 2008. He received 38,098 votes.

He was re-elected to the Provincial Assembly of the Punjab as a candidate for Pakistan Muslim League (N) (PML-N) for Constituency PP-219 (Khanewal-VIII) in 2013 Pakistani general election.

In April 2018, he announced to quit PML-N.

References

Living people
Punjab MPAs 2013–2018
1968 births
Pakistan Muslim League (N) politicians
Punjab MPAs 2008–2013